Thomas Trikasih Lembong (born 4 March 1971), better known as Tom Lembong, is an Indonesian politician. Since 27 July 2016, he has been Head of Indonesia's Investment Coordinating Board (Badan Koordinasi Penanaman Modal).. He formerly served as Minister of Trade of Indonesia from 12 August 2015 to 27 July 2016.

Career

Main positions held by Thomas Lembong before becoming Head of the Investment Coordinating Board include the following:

 1995: Staff member in the Equities Division in Morgan Stanley (Singapore).
 Senior Manager in the Corporate Finance Department of Makindo Securities, an investment bank in Jakarta.
 Investment banker with Deutsche Securities in Jakarta.
 2002-2005: Division Head, and Senior Vice President, Indonesian Bank Restructuring Agency in Jakarta.
 2006: Founding member and managing partner and CEO, Quvat Management, a private equity fund established in 2006, also working with Principia Management Group, Jakarta.
 2008: elected as a Young Global Leader at the World Economic Forum.
 2012: President Commissioner, PT Graha Layar Prima Tbk, an Indonesia-based cinema operator.

On 12 August 2015, President Joko Widodo ("Jokowi") appointed Thomas Lembong as Minister for Trade in the first cabinet reshuffle since the Jokowi administration had taken office on 27 October 2014.  Thomas Lembong held the position until he was appointed as Head, Investment Coordinating Board, in July 2016. On taking over as Head of the Investment Coordinating Board, he described President Jokowi's economic reform philosophy as having two principles: openness and competition.  He emphasised that following the cabinet reshuffle and the appointment of Enggartiasto Lukita as the next Trade Minister, he expected that there would be policy continuity in trade and investment policy in Indonesia.

References 

1971 births
People from Jakarta
Harvard University alumni
Living people
Trade ministers of Indonesia
Working Cabinet (Joko Widodo)
Indonesian business executives